Pepperl+Fuchs SE is a German multinational company with its headquarters in Mannheim, Germany. The company manufactures products for fabrication and process automation and is specialized in sensor manufacturing, for example, sensors that are used in automatic doors in elevators.

In 2022, the company's revenue first exceeded €1 billion.

History 
Pepperl+Fuchs was founded in 1945 by Walter Pepperl and Ludwig Fuchs as a radio repair shop. By 1948, Pepperl+Fuchs was expanding into other electronic production, leading to the development of the first proximity switch in 1958 and the first transistor amplifier with an intrinsically safe control circuit.

Pepperl+Fuchs has progressed in the development in areas such as sensing technology, intrinsic safety, and explosion protection technology. Now the company has approximately 6,300 employees worldwide with more than 40 foreign subsidiaries on six continents and manufacturing facilities in Germany, USA, Singapore, Hungary, China, Indonesia and Vietnam.

While the company was originally located in Sandhofen, the headquarters of Peperl+Fuchs moved to Schönau in 1971.

In 2019, Pepperl+Fuchs Comtrol partnered with Callisto Integration, in the manufacturing industry.

In 2019, Pepperl+Fuchs changed its legal structure from Gesellschaft mit beschränkter Haftung (GmbH) to Aktiengesellschaft (AG) and again in 2020 to Societas Europea (SE).

One company–two divisions 

The Factory Automation Division is a manufacturer of industrial sensors designed to address specific market needs on a global basis. It makes a range of inductive, capacitive, photoelectric, and ultrasonic sensors as well as identification systems, barcode and camera systems, rotary encoders, position measurement systems, cord-sets, and other accessories.

References

External links

 Official website

Electrical engineering companies of Germany
Companies based in Mannheim
Multinational companies headquartered in Germany
German brands